Kesselsdorf is a village in Saxony, Germany, part of the town of Wilsdruff. It is located close to the Saxon capital city of Dresden.

The village is known for the decisive Battle of Kesseldorf between Austrians and Prussians on December 15, 1745 in the War of Austrian Succession.

Notable Persons 

 Paul Daniel Longolius (1704-1779), writer
 Johann Christian Klengel (1751-1824), painter

References

Populated places in Sächsische Schweiz-Osterzgebirge
Wilsdruff